The Battle of Yerba Buena was an engagement during the Mexican–American War, during which the U.S. Navy captured and occupied the town of Yerba Buena, California (now San Francisco), without firing a shot.

Background
Upon declaring war on Mexico on May 13, 1846, President James Polk immediately called for the capture of California from the Mexicans. California had been a territory that Polk had desired ever since the annexation of Texas in 1845, and when war with Mexico broke out, he saw the perfect opportunity to take hold of the land he wanted. The U.S. Pacific Squadron was given the order to occupy every important port and city in California, with force if necessary. On July 7, 1846, the ships ,  and  captured the Alta Californian capital city of Monterey without firing a shot. This procedure of occupation would set the stage for the Battle of Yerba Buena, which would follow a few days later.

Battle
On July 9, 1846, the USS Portsmouth, captained by Commander John B. Montgomery, sailed into San Francisco Bay, with the intent of capturing the town of Yerba Buena. Aboard the Portsmouth were 220 sailors and enlisted men, along with a contingent of 27 marines. The small Mexican force garrisoning the Presidio did not fire upon the USS Portsmouth, for fear that they would become obliterated. The Portsmouth landed a distance off the shore, and a group of sailors, soldiers and marines, as well as Montgomery and his staff, disembarked in rowboats for Yerba Buena. Upon landing on the shore, Mexican soldiers held their fire, and the Californios grouped together to watch the American force. Montgomery and his force walked up to the flagpole in the town square, where the Mexican flag was flown. He quickly tore it down, and hoisted the Stars and Stripes in its place, proclaiming that the town of Yerba Buena, and all of the land surrounding it, belonged to the United States. After Montgomery's speech, the marine band began to play Yankee Doodle, and the USS Portsmouth fired a 21 gun salute, to celebrate the capture of Yerba Buena. Following the capture of the town itself, Montgomery ordered a detachment of troops to seize the Presidio of San Francisco, and confiscate any weaponry they found, which the detachment did without conflict.

References

Battles of the Conquest of California
History of San Francisco
July 1846 events